Songs For Children of All Ages is a folk album released in 1987 by Robin Williamson. The album was released in 1987 on the Flying Fish label and on Cladagh Records. It was re-issued with Winter's Turning in 1999 on Pig's Whisker Music.

Track listing 
All songs are Traditional, except "Witches Hat" and "The Water Song" (Williamson), both of which are originally from The Incredible String Band 1968 album The Hangman's Beautiful Daughter.
Witches Hat
The Herring Song
Three Men Went-A-Hunting
Fool's Song
Horse's Dance
Brian O'Linn
Butter
The Water Song
The Raggle Taggle Gipsies
Froggy Would A-Wooing Go
Liberty/Old Dan Tucker
Ivy, Sing Ivy
The Back of Burnie's Hill/ Over the Hill's and Far Away
The Gartan Lullaby

1987 albums
Robin Williamson albums